Penthaleidae, also referred to as earth mites, are a family of mites that are major winter pests of a variety of crops and pastures in southern Australia.

The following genera are found in the family in Australia:
Chromotydaeus Berlese, 1903
Halotydeus Berlese, 1891
Penthaleus Koch, 1835

References

Trombidiformes
Taxa named by Anthonie Cornelis Oudemans
Acari families